All Over the World: The Very Best of Electric Light Orchestra is a compilation album by the Electric Light Orchestra, released in 2005.

Overview
The album concentrates on the band's biggest singles released between late 1973 and 1983. The albums The Electric Light Orchestra, ELO 2, Eldorado, and Balance of Power were not represented on the compilation. A companion album Ticket to the Moon: The Very Best of Electric Light Orchestra Volume 2 featuring additional hit singles and deeper album cuts was released in 2007.

Release and reception
Originally released exclusively in the band's home market (the UK), the album sold very well, becoming the ELO's first Top Ten entry since Dino Record's compilation album The Very Best of the Electric Light Orchestra hit number 4 in 1994. All Over the World sold over 300,000 copies in the UK alone within a year and a half of its release.

The album was repackaged with new album art and re-released on 30 May 2011, once more reaching the UK top ten. It sold 848,021 copies by December 2014.

Following the band's appearance at the Glastonbury Festival in the legends slot in 2016, the album re-entered the chart, reaching No. 1 in the week ending 4 August 2016, and passed its million sales mark 11 years after its release.

Track listing
All tracks written by Jeff Lynne.

Personnel
Jeff Lynne – Vocals, guitars, keyboards, bass, drums ("Xanadu (New version)")
Bev Bevan – Drums, percussion
Richard Tandy – Keyboards, guitar
Kelly Groucutt – Bass, vocals
Mik Kaminski – Violin
Hugh McDowell – Cello
Melvyn Gale – Cello
Mike de Albuquerque – Bass ("Showdown", "Ma-Ma-Ma Belle")
Mike Edwards – Cello ("Showdown", "Ma-Ma-Ma Belle")
Wilfred Gibson – Violin ("Showdown", "Ma-Ma-Ma Belle")
Colin Walker – Cello ("Showdown", "Ma-Ma-Ma Belle")
Marc Bolan – Guitar ("Ma-Ma-Ma Belle")
Marc Mann - Keyboards ("Xanadu")

Charts and certifications

Weekly charts

Year-end charts

Decade-end charts

Certifications

Notes
A ^ First charted at #128 week of 1 September 2012 after the London Olympics opening and closing ceremonies featured "Mr. Blue Sky", peaked at #115 week of 26 May 2017.

References

2005 greatest hits albums
Albums produced by Jeff Lynne
Electric Light Orchestra compilation albums
Sony Music Australia albums